Guy Andre Hebert (born January 7, 1967) is an American former professional ice hockey goaltender. He is a graduate of La Salle Institute in Troy and Hamilton College in Clinton, New York. Despite being an American, he uses the French pronunciation of his first and last name. During his National Hockey League (NHL) career he played for the St. Louis Blues, Mighty Ducks of Anaheim and New York Rangers. Hebert currently works as associate host on Bally Sports Prime Ticket for Anaheim Ducks home games.

NHL career
Hebert was drafted by the St. Louis Blues in 1987, when he was a sophomore at Hamilton College. Hebert earned First Team All-America honors during his senior season at Hamilton College, with a record of 18 wins and 7 losses. Hebert started his professional career with the Peoria Rivermen of the International Hockey League (IHL), and in his second season won the IHL Championship, the Turner Cup, in 1990-91. Hebert was called up to the St. Louis Blues in December 1991 and won his first NHL start against the Buffalo Sabres, 6-3 on December 11, 1991. With Peoria, Hebert was named as an IHL Second Team All Star and also shared the IHL's James Norris Memorial Trophy with Pat Jablonski the same year.

Hebert was the first pick of the Mighty Ducks of Anaheim in the 1993 NHL Expansion Draft. Hebert's first head coach with Anaheim was Ron Wilson, who had coached Hebert in the 1990 Goodwill Games. Hebert played with the Ducks organization from its inaugural season in 1993 until midway through the 2000–01 NHL season, when he was placed on waivers and claimed by the New York Rangers. At that time he was the last of the original Ducks still with Anaheim. Hebert played in thirteen games for the Rangers before retiring in 2001. Hebert still ranks first or second in every major goalkeeping statistic of the Ducks franchise and led the team to its first NHL playoff appearance and series win with a Game 7 shutout (3-0) against the Phoenix Coyotes in the 1996-97 playoffs. While with Anaheim, Hebert was selected to the 1997 NHL All-Star Game.

International career
Hebert was selected to the United States national team for the 1990 Goodwill Games, winning the silver medal in a shootout against Russia. He played for the United States at the 1994 Men's World Ice Hockey Championships in Italy, as the US team beat Russia for the first time since the Miracle on Ice in 1980, and Hebert earned USA Hockey's Bob Johnson Award. Hebert played for the United States team that won the 1996 World Cup of Hockey, and also for the United States at the 1998 Winter Olympics, where they finished sixth.

Post-playing career
Today Hebert works for Fox Sports West and Prime Ticket as a television hockey analyst for the Anaheim Ducks.

Career statistics

Regular season and playoffs

International

References

External links

1967 births
Living people
American men's ice hockey goaltenders
Hamilton Continentals men's ice hockey players
Ice hockey players at the 1998 Winter Olympics
Mighty Ducks of Anaheim players
National Hockey League All-Stars
New York Rangers players
Olympic ice hockey players of the United States
Sportspeople from Troy, New York
Peoria Rivermen (IHL) players
St. Louis Blues draft picks
St. Louis Blues players
Ice hockey players from New York (state)
Competitors at the 1990 Goodwill Games